Andrew "Scootie" Randall (born January 5, 1990) is an American professional basketball player for Yamagata Wyverns in Japan. He played college basketball for Temple. As a junior, he averaged 10.7 points and 4.7 rebounds per game but missed seven games with a hairline fracture. In his senior season in 2012-13, Randall averaged 11.3 points, 6.3 rebounds and 2.1 assists per game. After graduation, he moved to Japan and joined the Iwate Big Bulls. In 2015, he averaged 20.2 points per game and made the All-Star Team. The following year, Randall played for Shimane Susanoo Magic, averaging 23.5 points, 8.9 rebounds and 2 assists per game. He was named All-Japanese BJ League Forward of the Year.

Career statistics 

|-
| align="left" | 2013-14
| align="left" | Ryukyu
| 10 || 0 || 25.0 || .416 || .333 || .851 || 6.5 || 2.6 || 0.9 || 0.2 || 16.3
|-
| align="left" | 2013-14
| align="left" | Iwate
| 44 || 5 || 23.0 || .452 || .343 || .721 || 5.5 || 2.1 || 0.8 || 0.2 ||  14.9
|-
| align="left" | 2014-15
| align="left" | Iwate
| 52 || 52|| 30.6|| .487|| .245|| .776|| 7.4|| 2.5|| 1.3|| 0.2|| 19.7
|-
| align="left" | 2015-16
| align="left" | Shimane
| 51 || 15 || 28.6 || 44.2 || 29.6 ||  77.7 || 8.7 || 2.1 || 1.4 || 0.3 || 23.7
|-
| align="left" | 2016-17
| align="left" | Ibaraki
| 31 || 11 || 28.5 || 46.2 || 29.6 || 81.5 || 9.0 || 2.9 || 1.1 || 0.4 || 21.0
|-
| align="left" | 2017-18
| align="left" | Gunma
| 38||15 ||21.9 || 45.8 ||33.7 ||74.4 ||6.9 ||3.6 ||1.0 ||0.5 ||14.9
|-
|}

References

1990 births
Living people
American expatriate basketball people in Japan
Cyberdyne Ibaraki Robots players
Gunma Crane Thunders players
Iwate Big Bulls players
Passlab Yamagata Wyverns players
Ryukyu Golden Kings players
Shimane Susanoo Magic players
Temple Owls men's basketball players
American men's basketball players
Power forwards (basketball)